Kam Tsin, also known as Kam Tsin Tsuen is a village and an area in the North District, in the New Territories in Hong Kong.

Administration
Kam Tsin is a recognized village under the New Territories Small House Policy. It is one of the villages represented within the Sheung Shui District Rural Committee. For electoral purposes, Kam Tsin is part of the Sheung Shui Rural constituency, which is currently represented by Simon Hau Fuk-tat.

Location
Kam Tsin is located south of Yin Kong, west of Kwu Tung, Ngau Tei and Hang Tau. Its south and east are surrounded by the Hong Kong Golf Club. The Fanling Bungalow and Fanling Lodge are on its southeast.

History
The Hau Clan, one of the Five Great Clans of the New Territories, arrived in modern-day Hong Kong towards the end of the 12th century, during the Southern Song Dynasty. They first settled at Ho Sheung Heung. They later settled three branch-villages: Yin Kong, Kam Tsin and Ping Kong.

In 1851, a war opposed the village of San Tin to Ping Kong and Kam Tsin.

Features
The village contains two temples which are used by the native Hau clan to worship their ancestors. One of these temples is open to visitors at weekends and on public holidays. There are also two schools and a kindergarten next to it.

The Hau Mei Fung Ancestral Hall is a declared monument. The Earth God Shrine of Kam Tsin Tsuen and the Hau Chung Fuk Tong Communal Hall are listed as Grade II historic buildings.

Transportation
Although Kam Tsin is by the side of Castle Peak Road and Fanling Highway nowadays, it is not connected to these roads directly. The access to the area is Kam Tsin Road, a branch road from Castle Peak Road. 

Public transport access is by green minibus 50A from Sheung Shui station or by a red minibus to and from Sheung Shui which only runs in the mornings. One can also access Kowloon Motor Bus bus 76K and red minibus 17, plus other green minibus services by crossing a footbridge over Fanling Highway.

See also
 De La Salle Secondary School, N.T.

References

External links

 Delineation of area of existing village Kam Tsin (Sheung Shui) for election of resident representative (2019 to 2022)
 Tai Ping Hung Chiu Ceremony

 
Villages in North District, Hong Kong